The 15 cm Schnelladekanone C/28 in Mörserlafette (SK C/28 in Mrs Laf) was a German heavy gun used in the Second World War.

Development 
Production of carriages for the 21 cm Mörser 18 and the 17 cm Kanone 18 in Mörserlafette exceeded available barrels in 1941 and eight naval 15 cm SK C/28 coast defense gun barrels were adapted for use on the carriages. They were converted to Heer-standard percussion firing (see the articles of those guns for details on the design of the carriage).

Operational use 
For Operation Barbarossa (the invasion of the Soviet Union), it equipped Artillerie-Abteilung 625. Most guns were replaced by 17 cm barrels as they became available. However, for Case Blue (the German summer offensive in southern Russia), one battery of Artillery Battalion (Artillerie-Abteilung) 767 was still equipped with them. That same battery retained them through the beginning of the Battle of Kursk in July 1943.

Ammunition
The 15 cm SK C/28 in Mrs Laf could not be converted to use the Heer's standard 15 cm ammunition and had to use naval ammunition. These included the 15 cm Sprgr L/4.6 KZ m. Hb., the 15cm Sprgr L/4.5 BdZ m. Hb. and the 15 cm Pzgr L/3.8 m. Hb. The former was a nose-fuzed  HE shell with a ballistic cap. The second was a base-fuzed  HE shell, also with a ballistic cap. The last-named was a standard  armor-piercing shell. Only one  bag of propellant was used in a separate-loading cartridge case.

References 
 Engelmann, Joachim and Scheibert, Horst. Deutsche Artillerie 1934-1945: Eine Dokumentation in Text, Skizzen und Bildern: Ausrüstung, Gliederung, Ausbildung, Führung, Einsatz. Limburg/Lahn, Germany: C. A. Starke, 1974
 Gander, Terry and Chamberlain, Peter. Weapons of the Third Reich: An Encyclopedic Survey of All Small Arms, Artillery and Special Weapons of the German Land Forces 1939-1945. New York: Doubleday, 1979 
 Hogg, Ian V. German Artillery of World War Two. 2nd corrected edition. Mechanicsville, PA: Stackpole Books, 1997

Notes

World War II artillery of Germany
150 mm artillery
Weapons and ammunition introduced in 1941